Michael Watford is an American dance music singer, who was born in Virginia and raised in New Jersey. He is best known for his gospel-influenced vocals on house records throughout the 1990s and 2000s.

Biography
Four of his singles charted on the United States Hot Dance Music/Club Play chart in the mid-1990s, including "So into You" which hit number one in 1994. The same track peaked at No. 53 on the UK Singles Chart.

Discography

Albums
Michael Watford (1994, East West America/Atlantic)

Singles
"Holdin' On" (1991, Atlantic)
"Luv 4-2" (1993, EastWest Records America)
"Happy Man" (1994, EastWest)
"Love to the World" (1994, EastWest)
"So into You" (1994, EastWest) - UK No. 53
Love to the World"/"Michael's Prayer" (1994, EastWest)
"Come Together" - Michael Watford & Robert Owens (1995, Hard Times) - UK No. 94
"Love Change Over" (1995, Hard Times) - UK No. 86
"Say Something" (1996, Free Bass)
"Sunshine" - GTS feat. Michael Watford (1996, Artimage Vinyls)
"Return Your Love to Me" (1996, Music Station)
"Mighty Love" (1996, Music Station)
"You Got It" - Deep Bros. feat. Michael Watford (1997, Azuli Records)
"For Your Love" (1997, Free Bass)
"I'm Coming Home" - Vice Versa feat. Michael Watford (1997, Azuli)
"Heaven Is Calling You" (1997, Ulterior Records)
"As" (1998, Soundmen On Wax)
"For You" - Jamie Lewis feat. Michael Watford (1999, Purple Music)
"Reach On Up" (with Tuff Jam) (1999, Locked On)
"Understand Me" - I-D feat. Michael Watford(1999, Hole)
"Watcha Gonna Do" - Jon Cutler & Michael Watford (2005, MN2S)
"It's Over" - Jamie Lewis & Michael Watford (2006, Purple Music)
"One More Time" - John Made vs Michael Watford (2006, Dream Beat)

See also
List of number-one dance hits (United States)
List of artists who reached number one on the US Dance chart

References

Year of birth missing (living people)
Living people
Singers from Virginia
21st-century African-American male singers
American house musicians
Locked On Records artists